is a Japanese manga by Jiro Taniguchi. It was serialized in Kodansha's Morning Party Zōkan from 1990 to 1991. It has been published in English by Fanfare/Ponent Mon and in French by Casterman. It was nominated for Best U.S. Edition of International Material—Japan at the 2007 Eisner Awards.

The work has been described as poetry or meditation and compared to the works of Yasujirō Ozu.

References

External links

Review at Anime News Network

1990 manga
Jiro Taniguchi
Kodansha manga
Seinen manga